Dennis Visser (born 13 April 1995 in Sneek) is a Dutch short track speed skater.

He won the gold medal in the 5000 metre relay event at the 2017 World Short Track Speed Skating Championships and also at the 2018 European Short Track Speed Skating Championships. He is selected for the 5000 m relay team at the 2018 Winter Olympics.

Biography
Visser started with short track speed skating when he was 8 years old, in Thialf, Heerenveen. In February 2017 Visser torn his ankle ligament.

He studies management at the Friesland College in Heerenveen.

References

1995 births
Living people
Dutch male short track speed skaters
Olympic short track speed skaters of the Netherlands
Short track speed skaters at the 2018 Winter Olympics
Sportspeople from Friesland
People from Sneek
Competitors at the 2015 Winter Universiade
21st-century Dutch people